Vojtěch Šrom (born 2 May 1988) is a Czech footballer who plays as a goalkeeper for SFC Opava.

Career
A product of the youth academy of Sigma Olomouc, Šrom left the club at the age of 19 and joined 1. HFK Olomouc. He kept 12 clean sheets during 2011–12 season, helping the team gain promotion to the 2. liga.

In January 2014, Šrom joined Baník Ostrava. He made his Czech First League debut on 5 May 2014 against Sigma Olomouc as a first-half substitute, replacing Jiří Pavlenka in the 17th minute.

On 5 January 2017, Šrom signed a contract with Bulgarian First League club Cherno More Varna. He made his debut against CSKA Sofia in a 0–2 home defeat on 19 February. On 29 May 2017, his contract was terminated by mutual consent.

In June 2017, Šrom joined Opava.

References

External links
 
 Player's profile at iDNES.cz (Czech)

1988 births
Living people
People from Litovel
Czech footballers
Czech expatriate footballers
Czech expatriate sportspeople in Bulgaria
Expatriate footballers in Bulgaria
Association football goalkeepers
Czech National Football League players
Czech First League players
First Professional Football League (Bulgaria) players
1. HFK Olomouc players
FC Baník Ostrava players
MFK Karviná players
PFC Cherno More Varna players
SFC Opava players
Sportspeople from the Olomouc Region